A mariner is a sailor.

Mariner or Mariners may also refer to:

Computing
 CBL-Mariner, a free and open source cloud infrastructure operating system based on Linux and developed by Microsoft
 Mariner (browser engine), a canceled project to enhance the Netscape Communicator suite of web browsers

Literature
 The Mariner (newspaper), an English-language newspaper in Toulouse, France
 Mariner Books, a division of Houghton Mifflin Harcourt
 Mariner Group, a chain of weekly newspapers

Music
 The Mariners (vocal group), a mid 20th century pop and gospel vocal group associated with Arthur Godfrey
 Mariner (album), a 2016 album Cult of Luna and Julie Christmas
 "Mariners Apartment Complex", a song by Lana Del Rey on the 2019 album Norman Fucking Rockwell!

Places
 Mariner Glacier, a major glacier descending southeast from the plateau of Victoria Land
 Mariner Mountain, a mountain on the west coast of Vancouver Island, British Columbia, Canada
 Mariner oilfield, an oilfield in the North Sea off Scotland
 Mariners Harbor, Staten Island, a neighborhood in the northwestern part Staten Island
 Mariners' Harbor station, a station on the abandoned North Shore Branch of the Staten Island Railway

Sports
 Arizona League Mariners, a minor league baseball team in Peoria, Arizona
 Baltimore Mariners, an American indoor football team
 Bellingham Mariners, a former Minor League Baseball team based in Bellingham, Washington
 Central Coast Mariners FC, an Australian association football team
 Gijón Mariners, a Spanish American football team
 Grimsby Town F.C., an English football team, nicknamed the Mariners
 Harwich Mariners, a collegiate summer baseball team based in Harwich, Massachusetts
 Hunter Mariners, an Australian former rugby league football club which participated in the short-lived Super League
 Maine Mariners (AHL), a professional ice hockey team based in Portland, Maine, from 1977 to 1992
 Maine Mariners (ECHL), a professional ice hockey team based in Portland, Maine, since 2018
 Merchant Marine Mariners, any of the United States Merchant Marine Academy's intercollegiate sports teams
 Mohun Bagan, a professional football club based in West Bengal, India, nicknamed the Mariners
 San Diego Mariners, an American World Hockey Association team
 Seattle Mariners, an American Major League Baseball team
 Mariner Moose, the team mascot of the Seattle Mariners
 Virginia Beach Mariners, an American United Soccer Leagues team
 Yarmouth Mariners, a Canadian Maritime Junior A Hockey League team
 Mariners, a fan club of Mohun Bagan A.C. or West Bengal

Vehicles

Ships
 HMS Mariner, a list of ships of the Royal Navy
 GSI Mariner, a Canadian research/survey ship
 HMS Mariner (1801), a gun-brig of the Royal Navy
 HMS Mariner (1846), an Acorn-class brig-sloop of the Royal Navy
 HMS Juno (1844) or HMS Mariner, a 26-gun sixth-rate
 HMS Mariner (1884), a Mariner-class composite screw sloop
 HMS Mariner (J380), an Algerine-class minesweeper launched in 1944
 Mariner (1807 ship), a ship launched at Whitby
 Mariner (1809 ship), a ship launched at Philadelphia
 Seven Seas Mariner, a cruise ship operated by Regent Seven Seas Cruises 
 USS Mariner (1906), a commercial tugboat operating in the Panama Canal area
 USS Mariner (SP-1136), a wooden-hulled United States Navy tugboat used in World War I
 Mariner 19, a model of American trailerable sailboat designed by Phillip Rhodes
 Mariner of the Seas, a cruise ship operated by Royal Caribbean

Aircraft
 Mariner Aircraft Mariner, a model American ultralight amphibious flying boat 
 Martin PBM Mariner, a model of American patrol bomber flying boat of World War II
 Two Wings Mariner UL, an American amphibious biplane designed for amateur construction

Cars
 Mercury Mariner, a compact SUV

Other uses
 Mariner program, a NASA project involving a series of 10 robotic probes to investigate Mars, Venus and Mercury
 Mariner (surname), a surname (and list of people with the surname)
 Mariner (crater), an impact crater on Mars
 Mariners Church, a non-denominational, Christian Church in Irvine, California
 Mariners' Church, an Anglican church in Detroit, Michigan
 Mariner High School (Cape Coral, Florida), high school in Cape Coral, Florida
 Mariner High School (Everett, Washington), high school in Everett, Washington
 Mariners House, a historic hotel in Boston, Massachusetts
 Mariners' Museum and Park, a museum in Newport News, Virginia

See also 
 Licensed mariner, a sailor who holds a license to hold senior officer-level positions aboard ships
 Marine (disambiguation)
 Mariner Mark II, planned but aborted spacecraft program for the years 1990 to 2010; later replaced by the Discovery Program
 Marines
 Marriner, a surname and given name
 Master mariner, a licensed mariner who holds the highest grade of seafarer qualification
 Merchant Mariner Credential, a credential issued by the United States Coast Guard
 The Rime of the Ancient Mariner, a poem by Samuel Taylor Coleridge